Blaze of Glory is the debut solo studio album by Jon Bon Jovi, the frontman of Bon Jovi. The album was released on August 7, 1990, through Mercury Records. It includes songs from and inspired by the movie Young Guns II. Emilio Estevez originally requested Bon Jovi's "Wanted Dead or Alive" as the theme song for his upcoming Billy the Kid sequel, but Jon Bon Jovi ended up composing an all-new theme song for the film's soundtrack instead.

The album featured guests such as Elton John, Little Richard, and Jeff Beck, was awarded a Golden Globe and received Academy Award and Grammy nominations.

Album information
The album mainly focuses on the theme of redemption and whether an individual's past wrongs will catch up with them. Another theme on the album is about making a stand and making yourself heard in the world. Jon Bon Jovi said on the 100,000,000 Bon Jovi Fans Can't Be Wrong DVD that he originally thought the album's aggression and themes dealt with Billy the Kid and Pat Garrett from Young Guns II but has come to realize that they reflect the bad place he was in at the time. The album more or less transitioned Jon's songwriting from mostly girls and having a good time to other subject matters, which would lead into him and his band's further maturing in songwriting with 1992's Keep the Faith.

Emilio Estevez originally approached Bon Jovi to ask him for permission to include the song "Wanted Dead or Alive" on the soundtrack. Bon Jovi did not feel the song's lyrics were appropriate; however, he was inspired by the project and resolved to write a new song for the film that would be more in keeping with the period and setting. He quickly wrote the song "Blaze of Glory", and performed it on acoustic guitar in the New Mexico desert for Estevez and John Fusco. This was the first time that "Blaze of Glory" was heard. Fusco called his co-producers into the trailer to listen, and it was named the theme song for Young Guns II on the spot. In an interview for UNCUT magazine, Kiefer Sutherland said, "When Jon (Bon Jovi) joined the team for Young Guns 2, we were all eating hamburgers in a diner and Jon was scribbling on this napkin for, say, six minutes. He declared he'd written 'Blaze of Glory', which of course then went through the roof in the States. He later gave Emilio Estevez the napkin. We were munching burgers while he wrote a No. 1 song... Made us feel stupid."

Music videos were made for the singles "Blaze of Glory", "Miracle", and "Dyin' Ain't Much of a Livin'" featuring Elton John.

Bon Jovi's lyrics from the song "Santa Fe" are quoted in the 1998 book, About a Boy, although the author, Nick Hornby, would have been light-heartedly referring to John Donne's "No Man Is an Island". The song is also quoted in the film High Fidelity.

Chart performance
The album peaked at No. 3 on the Billboard 200 and No. 2 on the UK Albums Chart.

The title track "Blaze of Glory" was released as the first single and hit No. 1 on the Billboard Hot 100 and the Mainstream rock charts. "Miracle" was released as the second single and charted at #12 on the Billboard Hot 100 and #20 on the Mainstream rock charts and the third single "Never Say Die" charted in Australia, Canada and Poland but was not released in the US. "Dyin Ain't Much of a Livin' featuring Elton John and "Santa Fe" were released as promo singles.

In 1998, a country duet version of "Bang a Drum" was released with country singer Chris LeDoux, the track was released as a single with a music video and reached number 68 on the US Hot Country Songs chart.

Film
Young Guns II is a 1990 western film, and the sequel to Young Guns (1988). It stars Emilio Estevez, Kiefer Sutherland, Lou Diamond Phillips, Christian Slater, and features William Petersen as Pat Garrett. It was written and produced by John Fusco and directed by Geoff Murphy.

Jon Bon Jovi also made a cameo appearance in the film as one of the prisoners in the pit with Doc and Chavez.

Track listing
All songs written and composed by Jon Bon Jovi, except where noted.

 "Billy Get Your Guns" – 4:49
 "Miracle" – 5:20
 "Blaze of Glory" – 5:35
 "Blood Money" – 2:34
 "Santa Fe" – 5:42
 "Justice in the Barrel" – 6:48
 "Never Say Die" – 4:54
 "You Really Got Me Now" – 2:24
 "Bang a Drum" – 4:44
 "Dyin' Ain't Much of a Livin'" – 4:40
 "Guano City" (Alan Silvestri) – 1:16

Note: The only tracks heard in the movie are "Billy Get Your Guns", "Blaze of Glory" (both of which are played over the end credits), and the Silvestri score cue.

Personnel
Musicians (adapted from CD liner notes).  Credits also from other sources.

 Jon Bon Jovi – vocals, backing vocals, guitars (tracks 2-3, 5-10), piano (track 3), harmonica (track 4), producer
 Kenny Aronoff – drums, percussion
 Jeff Beck – electric guitar (tracks 6, 10), slide guitar, guitar solo (tracks 1-3, 6-7, 9)
 Robbin Crosby – guitar (track 7)
 Bob Glaub – bass (tracks 5, 10)
 Randy Jackson – bass (tracks 1-3, 6-9)
 Ron Jacobs – engineer
 Elton John – piano (tracks 1, 10), backing vocals (track 10)
 Danny Kortchmar – guitar (tracks 1-2, 4-9), producer
 Dale Lavi – hand claps
 Myrna Matthews, Julia Waters, Maxine Waters – backing vocals (tracks 2, 6, 9, 10)
 Carmella Lento – backing vocals
 Aldo Nova – guitars, keyboards, piano, tambourine
 Phil Parlapiano – accordion (tracks 2, 4)
 Lou Diamond Phillips – vocals (track 6)
 The Runners – hand claps (track 1)
 Little Richard – piano, vocals (track 8)
 Brian Scheuble – engineer
 Alan Silvestri – arranger
 Benmont Tench – Hammond organ (tracks 1-3, 5-7, 9-10), piano (tracks 5, 8)
 Waddy Wachtel – guitar (track 9), slide guitar (track 8), dobro (track 3)

Production
 Brian Scheuble, Rob Jacobs – engineering
 JD Dworkow – production coordinator

Charts

Weekly charts

Year-end charts

Certifications

References 

1990 debut albums
Jon Bon Jovi albums
Mercury Records albums